Vani Rani may refer to

Vani Rani (film), 1974 Tamil film remake of the Hindi film Seeta and Geeta
Vani Rani (TV series), Tamil serial